Max, 13 is the 1999  debut feature film of director by Abe Levy, revolving around a 13-year-old boy coming of age in rural Northern California.  This film featured Marshall resident, Max Hurwitz, who continues to reside in Marshall as well as Petaluma.

Cast
Max Hurwitz as Max 
Jorja Dwyer as Claire 
Christopher Jaymes as Daniel 
April Daniels as Valerie 
Josh Faure-Brac as Camera Store Clerk 
Daedalus Howell as Ray 
Kandis Kozolanka as Mrs. Eggles 
Aerielle Levy as Florida 
Greg Marquardt as Harvey 
Christine Renaudin as Frida 
Devon Rumrill as Floyd 
Nick Scott as Dallas 
Shaina Solomon as Sasha 
Josh Staples as Ronnie 
Sienna S'Zell as Marianne 
Robert Vandermaaten as Jonathan

Additional sources
metroactive.com, (about Levy) "North Bay filmmakers forge a new cinematic scene: Abe Levy and Silver Tree ...Lifelong Sonoma County resident Abe Levy has proven himself a filmmaker to the degree that he actually has a second home in Hollywood...."
Daedalus Howell: "09.15.99, FINAL CUT: Tomales-borne director Abe Levy unthaws the freeze-frame on his coming-of-age opus "Max, 13 this weekend at the Phoenix Theater"
Sonoma Wine Country: "Ever since 1973, Petaluma has served as a location for many major films, including: ...Max, 13 (1997) 4 day shoot in Petaluma and 10 day shoot in Tomales..."
Petaluma.org: "Some of the movies in which you can find scenes of Petaluma are: ...Max, 13 (1997)..."
Cinema Picuria: (about Levy) "Abe Levy has directed a handful of feature films"
Faltbush Pictures: (about the editor) "Jeni Matson edited Abe Levy's acclaimed debut feature, MAX, 13"

References

External links

1999 films
American coming-of-age films
American independent films
Films directed by Abe Levy
1990s American films